Shi Ke (born 8 January 1993) is a Chinese footballer who currently plays as a centre-back for Shandong Taishan in the Chinese Super League.

Club career
Shi Ke started his football career in 2006 when he joined Hangzhou Greentown's youth academy from Wuxi Sports School. He was loaned out to China League Two club Wenzhou Provenza for the 2011 season. He scored his first goal for the club on 17 August 2011 in a 1–1 draw against Sichuan FC. Shi was promoted to the club's first team by then manager Takeshi Okada in 2012. He made his debut for the club on 25 March 2012 in a 1–0 win against Beijing Guoan. He soon became a regular for the club after Du Wei joined Shandong Luneng in July 2012.

On 24 January 2015, Shi transferred to fellow Chinese Super League side Shanghai SIPG. He made his debut for the club on 19 June 2015 in a 5–3 win against Changchun Yatai. He scored his first goal for the club on 28 February 2017 in a 5–1 win against Western Sydney Wanderers in the 2017 AFC Champions League. He would go on to establish himself as a vital member of the team and he would go on the win the club's first league title at the end of the 2018 Chinese Super League season.

After six seasons in Shanghai, Shi would join fellow top tier club Shandong Taishan on 20 February 2021. He made his debut for the club on 20 April 2021 in a league game against Chongqing Liangjiang Athletic that ended in a 2-0 victory. He would immediately establish himself as an integral member of the teams defence that went on to the win the 2021 Chinese Super League title and 2021 Chinese FA Cup. This would be followed up by him winning the 2022 Chinese FA Cup with them the next season.

International career
Shi received his first call-up to the Chinese under-20 national team by then manager Su Maozhen in June 2010. He played once in the 2010 AFC U-19 Championship against Thailand in the group stage. Shi continued to play for the under-20 national team in the 2011 Toulon Tournament and was appointed as captain by then manager Jan Olde Riekerink. He made three appearances during 2012 AFC U-19 Championship qualification as the under-20 national team qualified for the 2012 AFC U-19 Championship.

Shi was called up to the Chinese under-23 national team in April 2012. He made his debut for the under-23 national team on 9 May 2012 in a 2–2 draw against Malawi. He was included in the squad for 2013 AFC U-22 Asian Cup qualification and made three appearances as China qualified for the 2013 AFC U-22 Championship.

Shi was first called up to the Chinese national team for the 2013 EAFF East Asian Cup. He made his debut on 28 July 2013 in a 4–3 win against Australia, coming on as a substitute for Yang Hao.

Career statistics

Club statistics
.

International statistics

Honours

Club
Shanghai SIPG
Chinese Super League: 2018
Chinese FA Super Cup: 2019

Shandong Taishan
Chinese Super League: 2021
Chinese FA Cup: 2021, 2022

References

External links
 
 

1993 births
Living people
Sportspeople from Xuzhou
Chinese footballers
Footballers from Jiangsu
Zhejiang Professional F.C. players
Shanghai Port F.C. players
Shandong Taishan F.C. players
Chinese Super League players
China League Two players
China international footballers
Footballers at the 2014 Asian Games
2019 AFC Asian Cup players
Association football defenders
Asian Games competitors for China